Spirodela is a genus of aquatic plants,  one of several genera containing plants commonly called duckweed.  Spirodela species are members of the Araceae under the APG II system. They were formerly members of the Lemnaceae.

Spirodela species are free-floating thalli; two to five plants may remain connected to each other. Plants are green, but may have a red or brown underside.  Multiple roots (seven to 12) emerge from each thallus.  Spirodela is larger than Lemna ( – , one root per thallus).

Certain species of Spirodela overwinter as turions, a dormant form that lacks air pockets, so sinks to the bottom of the pond.  In spring, turions rise to the surface and germinate to start a new population.

Spirodela often forms floating mats with related species, e.g. Lemna and Wolffia.

The genus is virtually cosmopolitan in distribution. Spirodela punctata is sometimes treated as Landoltia punctata.

Species

 Spirodela oligorrhiza (Kurz) Hegelm. - Africa, Australia, southern Asia
 Spirodela polyrhiza  (L.) Schleid. - cosmopolitan 
 Spirodela punctata  (G.Mey.) C.H.Thomps. - South America, Central America, West Indies
 Spirodela sichuanensis  M.G.Liu & K.M.Xie - southern China

References

External links
Armstrong, W. (2005) Wayne Armstrong's treatment of the Lemnaceae.
Cross, J.W. (2006). The Charms of Duckweed. 
 The Duckweed Genome Project

Lemnoideae
Araceae genera
Aquatic plants